Macedonian Slavs may refer to several Slavic peoples in the historical and geographical region of Macedonia:

 Macedonians (ethnic group) (autonym: Makedonci)
 Macedonian Bulgarians, ethnic Bulgarians from the region of Macedonia
 Bulgarians in North Macedonia
 Slavic speakers of Greek Macedonia, with diverse ethnic identifications
 Slavic speakers in Ottoman Macedonia, with diverse ethnic identifications
 Macedonian Serbs, ethnic Serbs from the region of Macedonia
 Serbs in North Macedonia
 Macedonian Muslims, Slavic Muslims from the region of Macedonia, with diverse ethnic identifications

See also
 Several early medieval Slavic tribes are associated with the region of Macedonia, including: Berziti, Drougoubitai, Rhynchinoi, Sagudates, Smolyani, Strymonites etc.
 Slav (disambiguation)
 Slavic (disambiguation)
 Macedonian (disambiguation)
 Macedonia (disambiguation)
 Macedonia (terminology)
 Macedonia naming dispute
 Macedonian language naming dispute

Language and nationality disambiguation pages